The canton of Vonnas is an administrative division of the Ain department, in eastern France. It was created at the French canton reorganisation which came into effect in March 2015. Its seat is in Vonnas.

It consists of the following communes:
 
Bey 
Biziat
Chanoz-Châtenay
Chaveyriat
Cormoranche-sur-Saône
Crottet
Cruzilles-lès-Mépillat
Grièges
Laiz
Mézériat
Perrex
Pont-de-Veyle
Saint-André-d'Huiriat
Saint-Cyr-sur-Menthon
Saint-Genis-sur-Menthon
Saint-Jean-sur-Veyle
Saint-Julien-sur-Veyle
Saint-Laurent-sur-Saône
Vonnas

References

Cantons of Ain